Kuncz (deprecated: Colonia Kunz;) is a district in eastern Timișoara. Kuncz is a former estate of industrialist József Kuncz (1823–1895), who built several factories and barracks for workers here. Its rural appearance has been preserved over time. Kuncz is noted for its large Roma population.

References 

Districts of Timișoara